Nick Doberer (born 3 March 1990) is a Chilean rugby league footballer who currently plays internationally for Chile. As of 2018 he is the current captain of the Chile national team.

Career
Doberer made is international debut for Chile in their 58-20 win against El Salvador. In 2018 he was selected in Chile’s squad for the 2021 World Cup qualifiers.

References

1990 births
Living people
Chile national rugby league team captains
Chile national rugby league team players
Chilean rugby league players
Rugby league second-rows